Phyllis viscosa is like Phyllis nobla but smaller with narrow, sticky leaves and short, dense inflorescence.

Distribution

References

Flora of the Canary Islands
Endemic flora of the Canary Islands
Endemic flora of Macaronesia
Anthospermeae